Wah Ming Chang (August 2, 1917 – December 22, 2003) was an American designer, sculptor, and artist.  With the encouragement of his adoptive father, James Blanding Sloan, he began exhibiting his prints and watercolors at the age of seven to highly favorable reviews.  Chang worked with Sloan on several theatre productions and in the 1940s, they briefly created their own studio to produce films.   He is known later in life for his sculpture and the props he designed for Star Trek: The Original Series, including the tricorder and communicator.

Early life 
The Chang family moved from Honolulu, Hawaii to San Francisco, California and about 1920 opened the Ho-Ho Tea Room on Sutter Street, which became a favorite venue for the city's Bohemian artists.  Wah-Ming's mother, Fai Sue Chang, was a graduate of Berkeley's California School of Arts and Crafts (today's California College of the Arts), where she specialized in fashion design and etching.  When she died in 1928, her husband persuaded Wah Ming Chang's art teacher and family friends, the highly respected printmaker, puppeteer, and theatre designer, James Blanding Sloan and his wife Mildred Taylor, to become his son's legal guardians.  Sloan exhibited Wah Ming's etchings and watercolors in public exhibitions as early as 1925 to favorable reviews in the San Francisco Bay Area and later in the largest art colony on the Pacific Coast, Carmel-by-the-Sea.  The child became part of Sloan's family, traveled in 1926 to Taos, New Mexico for the on-site study of American Indian culture, and in 1928 displayed his block prints in joint exhibitions with Sloan at the prestigious Philadelphia Print Club and in Pasadena, California.

Career 
He became a valued assistant in several of Sloan's marionette theatres as well as in productions for the Hollywood Bowl Ballet and the "Cavalcade of Texas."  In the mid-1940s Chang formed a joint studio business with Sloan, The East-West Film Company, and produced such memorable films as Pick a Bale of Cotton (an interview and performance with the legendary blues and folk singer Lead Belly in 1944) and the highly controversial anti-war short (1946–47), The Way of Peace, created in part with elaborate miniature sets and puppets in stop-motion.

For Star Trek, Chang built costumes for the salt vampire ("The Man Trap"), the Gorn ("Arena") and Balok's false image ("The Corbomite Maneuver").  He created tribbles by using artificial fur stuffed with foam, the Neanderthals in "The Galileo Seven", and the Romulan Bird of Prey ("Balance of Terror"), and the Vulcan harp first seen in "Charlie X" and later seen in "The Conscience of the King", "Amok Time", "The Way to Eden"; and Star Trek V: The Final Frontier. Chang is mistakenly credited with having designed the phaser; it was actually designed by the Art Director of the original series, Matt Jefferies. The Desilu prop department prepared a single "hero" working model phaser, deemed unacceptable by Gene Roddenberry; Wah Chang prepared additional working and dummy mockups of the phaser, as well as other principal props. A Desilu invoice dated August 22, 1966, shows Chang "reworking phasers" for $520.00.

 Chang's communicator design has been credited as an inspiration for modern flip-type cell phones.  His Balok effigy was used in "The Corbomite Maneuver" Star Trek episode — and at the conclusion of many closing credits sequences of the series.

His other film credits include sculpting the maquette of Pinocchio which was used as the reference for the animators of the classic Walt Disney feature, and articulated deer models for Bambi. He designed the spectacular headdress worn by Elizabeth Taylor in the feature film Cleopatra.  Other work included building the time machine and sphinx from 1960s movie The Time Machine, and the dragon seen (only in the English-dubbed version) of Goliath and the Dragon (1960).  Chang's firm, Project Unlimited, Inc., would win Academy Award recognition for its special effects, but Chang was not listed on the award, due to the way the credits were submitted to the academy. Film historian Bob Burns reported that Chang didn't object to this. "He was the most humble, gentle man I've ever known in my life," Burns said. "He never boasted about anything he did, and he just did remarkable stuff."

In addition, Chang built the artificial creature in "The Architects of Fear" episode of the original The Outer Limits, some props for the original Planet of the Apes film, the frightening skeleton animated in The Power, the flying machine in The Master of the World, and the dinosaurs in Land of the Lost.

Chang's work as a stop-motion animator through the effects company Centaur Productions, operated with fellow artist Gene Warren, has been enjoyed for years in the cartoons Hardrock, Coco and Joe and Suzy Snowflake.

Later life 
Chang moved with his wife, Glenella Taylor, to Carmel Valley, California in 1970, where he joined the Carmel Art Association and began producing bronze sculptures of wildlife and endangered species.  

In 1941, Wah Ming was diagnosed with polio following flu-like symptoms. After an extended stay at the Twin Oaks Sanitarium hospital in San Gabriel, California, and treatments that included confinement in an iron lung. He eventually would walk again, but for the rest of his life, never had enough strength in his lungs to be able to blow up a balloon.

While his earlier creative efforts were concerned with special effects and film related wonders, his more mature artistic creations were delightful bronze sculptures and whimsical statuary. The latter ranged from a life-sized 3.5 foot tall Dennis the Menace, commissioned by creator Hank Ketcham and displayed in Dennis Park in Monterey, California, to the smaller statues such as Girl and Frog, which is owned by a private collector in Los Angeles.

Death
Chang died on December 22, 2003 in Carmel Valley at age 86. A public memorial service was held at the Community Church of the Monterey Peninsula in Carmel.

Documentaries
Chang produced the educational 1970 short film Dinosaurs: The Terrible Lizards, a stop-motion feature which discussed life in the Mesozoic Era. It would later gain a "Revised Edition" in 1986.

Chang appeared in the documentary The Fantasy Film Worlds of George Pal (1985) (Produced and directed by Arnold Leibovit).

Mr. Chang was featured in the documentary Time Machine: The Journey Back (1993), produced and directed by Clyde Lucas.

Sculptures 
Chang produced bronze sculptures in collaboration with Henry "Bob" Jones after meeting at Disney.

Publications

References

External links
 

1917 births
2003 deaths
People from Carmel Valley, California
Artists from Honolulu
Artists from San Francisco
American artists of Chinese descent
American animated film producers
Stop motion animators
Prop designers
American designers
American sculptors
American animators